The Pierce County Library System (PCLS) is a library system serving the residents of Pierce County, Washington. The Pierce County Library System has 20 library locations serving 580,000 people in unincorporated Pierce County and 15 cities and towns which have annexed to the system for library service. It circulates 6.9 million items annually, hosts seasonal youth story times, teen clubs, events for youth and adults, classes for skills development and technology, an active summer reading program, and connects with social media. In 2016, there were 334,362 library cardholders, PCLS locations had more than 2.2 million visitors, and the website had more than 3.5 million visitors.

History

The Pierce County Library System was formed by a ballot measure passed by voters in unincorporated Pierce County on November 7, 1944. The library began operating on January 2, 1946, and opened seven station branches in its first year. The system served unincorporated areas of the county as well as towns and cities that annex or contract with PCLS. Over its 75+ years, it has had five directors: Marion Cromwell, Carolyn Else, Neel Parikh, Georgia Lomax, and Gretchen Caserotti.

Locations

Current Locations

Administrative Center & Library (Tacoma, Washington)
Anderson Island
Bonney Lake
Buckley
DuPont
Eatonville
Fife
Gig Harbor/Peninsula
Graham
Key Center (Key Peninsula)
Lakewood
Milton/Edgewood
Orting
Parkland/Spanaway
South Hill
Steilacoom
Summit (Tacoma)
Sumner
Tillicum (Lakewood)
University Place

The library's headquarters, Administrative Center & Library, is in the Summit-Waller area, southeast of Tacoma, Washington. The busiest locations are Gig Harbor, South Hill, Lakewood, University Place, and Parkland/Spanaway.

Former locations
The library system has added and closed many other library locations over its history. Defunct branches include: American Lake Gardens, Browns Point, Longmire, McNeil Island, National, and Wilkeson.

Service area
The Pierce County Library System serves all of rural Pierce County and any of the cities that have annexed into its service area. This includes all of the cities listed above, but does not include Carbonado, Fircrest, and Ruston.

See also
King County Library System
Puyallup Public Library
Tacoma Public Library
Timberland Regional Library (Southwest Washington)

References

External links

County library systems in Washington (state)
Government agencies established in 1946
Library districts
Education in Pierce County, Washington